Elizabeth Cackowski is an American comedy writer and actress.

Career
Cackowski began her comedy career at The Second City in Chicago where she was discovered and hired by Saturday Night Live, where she worked as a writer from 2003 to 2006. Since leaving SNL, she and Maggie Carey created an online series called The Jeannie Tate Show.

She appeared in feature films such as Forgetting Sarah Marshall and I Love You, Man. She also co-starred as "Byte" in the Adult Swim series Fat Guy Stuck in Internet in 2008 and as a housewife in "Infomercials" in 2014. In early 2009, Cackowski wrote for the short-lived ABC sitcom In the Motherhood. From 2009 to 2010, she worked as a writer and story editor on the NBC comedy series Community. Her brother is comedian Craig Cackowski, who has also appeared with guest roles on Community. She also wrote for the short-lived NBC sitcom Up All Night. She wrote 2 episodes of 2015 comedy The Last Man on Earth on Fox.

She also played the role of Wendy, the realtor in the comedy movie Neighbors (2014), and in its sequel Neighbors 2: Sorority Rising (2016).

Personal life 
Her surname is Polish. She is married to Akiva Schaffer, whom she met when they were both writing for the 2005 MTV Movie Awards.

Filmography
As actress
Forgetting Sarah Marshall (2008) - Liz Bretter
I Love You, Man (2009) - Zooey's Friend
Cloudy with a Chance of Meatballs (2009) - Flint's Teacher (voice role)
The Watch (2012) - Carla
The To Do List (2013) - Aerobics instructor
Neighbors (2014) - Wendy the Realtor
Search Party (2014) - Kenny's Mom
Neighbors 2: Sorority Rising (2016) - Wendy the Realtor
Popstar: Never Stop Never Stopping (2016) - Poppies Producer
Wine Country (2019) - Sommelier
An American Pickle (2020) - Susan O'Malley
Chip 'n Dale: Rescue Rangers (2022) - Tigra and Officer O'Hara

References

External links

Living people
21st-century American actresses
American film actresses
American television actresses
American television writers
American women comedians
American women television writers
American people of Polish descent
21st-century American comedians
21st-century American screenwriters
1977 births